Rupankar Bagchi, also known mononymously Rupankar is a Bengali singer-songwriter, playback singer and actor from Kolkata, West Bengal, India.

He has sung many famous songs in recent Bengali films like Chalo Let's Go (2008), Baishe Srabon (2011), Aparajita Tumi (2012), Hemlock society (2012), Dutta Vs Dutta (2012), Jaatishwar (2014), Chotushkone (2014) and Monn (2018). He was awarded the National Film Award for Best Male Playback Singer of Government of India for the song "E Tumi Kemon Tumi" from Jaatishwar. During the COVID-19 pandemic, he released a song titled Tor Saathe, under Times Music label.

Early life
Bagchi was born in a Bengali family and at an early age he learned classical vocal from his father Ritendra Nath Bagchi and Rabindra Sangeet from his mother Sumitra Bagchi. He was trained in classical music from Sukumar Mitra and in modern songs from Jatileswar Mukhopadhyay. His first stage performance was at the age of eleven. In 1999, he married Chaitali Lahiri.

Discography
Tumi Shunbe Ki? (Debut album)
 Ei jeno shei chokh
 Bondhu dekha hobe
Anmone Amake Bhabo
Meghe roddure
Ami Tomake Chini
Bhokatta
Poth Bhola (Rabindra Sangeet) 
Highway
Ganer jharnatolay (Rabindra Sangeet)
O chand
Fire esho Ruby ray
Tomay gan shonabo (Rabindra Sangeet)
Neel
Shopping Mall
Tui jabi koto dur 
Faltu
Sada Kalo
Tagore timeless (Rabindra Sangeet)
Monihar
Shokol Kajer Kaji (Nazrul Sangeet)
Roots(folk)
Acoustic
Best of Rupankar
Best of Rupankar, Vol. 2

Tane
Anek Durey with Bumpai Chakraborty
Rupkothar Tumi with Jayanta Roy
Elo agomonir din with Bumpai Chakraborty and diganta Das
Kal Bhor Hobey, duet with Sarbajit Ghosh from the music album Monn.

Priyotama 3 
Tor Saathe duet with Roma Mitra
Oi dakho

Famous songs
 Govire Jao –  Baishe Srabon (2011)
 Sharata din Ar Shara Raat – Rupkatha Noy (2011)
 Roopkathara –  Aparajita Tumi (2012)
 Gaan Khuje Paai –  Chalo Let's Go (2008)
 Chupi Chupi Raat –  Chalo Let's Go (2008)
 Amar Mawte – Hemlock society (2012)
 Tobu jodi –  Dutta Vs Dutta (2012)
 Jhal Legechey – Ganesh Talkies (2013)
 Shedin Dujoney – Ganesh Talkies (2013)
 E Tumi Kemon Tumi – Jaatishwar (2014)
 Sohosa Ele Ki – Jaatishwar (2014)
 Setai Sotti – Chotushkone (2014)
 Oh Baby – Na Jene Mon (2014)
 Tor Nam Prem – Besh Korechi Prem Korechi (2015)
Ae boshonte [Z cinema film onne boshonte 2015]
Kal Bhor Hobey (feat. Sarbajit Ghosh) – Monn (2018)
Jaago Uma- Uma (2018)
Tor Saathe - 2020 - Times Music

Awards

 2014: National Film Award for Best Male Playback Singer – "E Tumi Kemon Tumi" from Jaatishwar

Nomination
 2010 : Bangla Sangit Purashkar for Best Male Singer – "Tobe Prem Kake Chay" from album Mohonay
 2010 : Bangla Sangit Purashkar for Best Album – for Mohonay
 2011: Bangla Sangit Purashkar for Best Male Playback Singer – "Gobheere Jao" from Baishe Srabon
 2011 : Radio Mirchi Music Award for Best Male Playback Singer – "Gobheere Jao" from Baishe Srabon
 2011 : Friends FM Award for Best Male Playback Singer – "Gobheere Jao" from Baishe Srabon
 2011 : Zee Bangla Gourab Samman for Best Male Playback Singer – "Gobheere Jao" from Baishe Srabon
2019 : The SRL Award for Vocalist of the Decade 2010 – 2019 (Male), given by SRL Motion Pictures Entertainment

Filmography
 Sin Sister as police detective Agnibesh Chatterjee.
 Biday Byomkesh as DC Krishnendu Malo
Played a cameo as himself singing in the studio in the song Kal Bhor Hobey from Monn alongside Sarbajit Ghosh. The video also featured Rohan Basu, Sonia Saha & Amrita Chakraborty in various other roles.
Manikanchana 
 The stoneman murders (web series)(hoichoi)
 Abar Kanchanjangha

References

External links 

 
 
 
 

Bengali singers
Indian male playback singers
Bengali Hindus
Living people
Singers from Kolkata
Best Male Playback Singer National Film Award winners
1972 births